Nathaniel Ward was a clergyman and pamphleteer.

Nathaniel Ward may also refer to:

Nathaniel Bagshaw Ward, English doctor
Nathaniel Ward, musician in The Weasels

See also
Nathan Ward, ice hockey player